La Pesga is a municipality located in Trasierra/Tierras de Granadilla, province of Cáceres, Extremadura, Spain. According to the 2005 census (INE), the municipality has a population of 1162 inhabitants.

The Los Angeles River flows by the town, located near the limit with Las Hurdes.

See also
Trasierra/Tierras de Granadilla

References

External links

Ayuntamiento de La Pesga

Municipalities in the Province of Cáceres